Santo International Airport is an airport in Luganville on Espiritu Santo in Vanuatu . The airport used to be called Santo-Pekoa International airport until it was renamed in the Vanuatu AIPV amendment released on 16 June 2021. Airports Vanuatu Limited provides aviation services for the airport.

Airlines and destinations

History

World War II
The 7th Naval Construction Battalion arrived on Santo on 11 August 1942 to begin construction of more extensive Espiritu Santo Naval Base air facilities to support the Guadalcanal Campaign. After completing a second fighter airfield at Turtle Bay they began constructing two bomber fields, one at Palikulo Bay known as Bomber Field No. 1 and the other at Pekoa, known as Bomber Field No. 2. The completed airfield was operational in December 1942 and was known as "Bomber Field No. 2" or "Pekoa Field".

The Thirteenth Air Force was based at Pekoa from 13 January 1943 until 20 January 1944 when it moved to Carney Airfield on Guadalcanal. Units assigned were:

 Headquarters, XIII Bomber Command, 13 January-20 August 1943
 Headquarters, XIII Fighter Command, 22 January–December 1943
 5th Bombardment Group, 1 December 1942 – 19 August 1943
 11th Bombardment Group, 22 July 1942 – 8 April 1943
 18th Fighter Group, 11 March-17 April 1943
 4th Reconnaissance Group, 23 January 1943 – 6 May 1944
 403d Troop Carrier Group, 13 September 1943 – 30 August 1944

As the war moved further north, Pekoa Airfield was closed on 8 February 1945 and all traffic routed to Palikulo Bay Airfield.

Postwar
Luganville Airfield was used as a civilian airstrip until the early 1970s, however as it was on higher ground it was often clouded in and so it was decided to move all operations to the former Pekoa Airfield/Bomber Field No.2 which became Santo-Pekoa International Airport.

Of the four wartime airfields on Espiritu Santo: Turtle Bay Airfield, Palikulo Bay Airfield, Luganville Airfield and Pekoa; Pekoa is the only wartime airfield still in use.

See also

 Luganville Airfield
 Luganville Seaplane Base
 Palikulo Bay Airfield
 Turtle Bay Airfield
 USAAF in the South Pacific

References

 Maurer, Maurer (1983). Air Force Combat Units Of World War II. Maxwell AFB, Alabama: Office of Air Force History. .

External links
Airports Vanuatu Ltd.

Airfields of the United States Army Air Forces in the Pacific Ocean theatre of World War II
Airports in Vanuatu
Espiritu Santo
Sanma Province
Airfields of the United States Army Air Forces Air Transport Command in the Pacific Ocean Theater
1942 establishments in the New Hebrides
Seabees